KNCH (90.1 FM) is the National Public Radio station for the Concho Valley of west-central Texas.  Licensed to San Angelo, it is owned by Texas Tech University and operated out of Texas Tech's campus in Lubbock.  However, it is branded as a separate station.

The station first signed on in 1996 as KUTX, owned by the University of Texas as a sister station to KUT in Austin.  Its arrival brought public radio to one of the few areas in the nation that didn't have a clear signal from a public radio station.  The station was a straight simulcast of KUT, with no local programming.

In 2007, however, UT began discussions about selling KUTX to Texas Tech.  At the time, Angelo State University was in the process of joining the Texas Tech University System, and UT officials thought KUTX would be a perfect complement.  The sale closed in December 2009.  Texas Tech officially took control in April 2010 and changed the calls to the current KNCH.  Texas Tech immediately set about rebranding KNCH as a more locally oriented station, though for the time being it is operated out of the studios of Texas Tech's KTTZ-FM.

External links

KUTX sold to Tech, call letters changed to KNCH

NPR member stations
NCH
Texas Tech University
Radio stations established in 1996